UMO can refer to:

 Unknown Mortal Orchestra, a psychedelic rock band from New Zealand
 United Macedonian Organisation: Ilinden–Pirin, a Macedonian organization in Bulgaria
 University of Maine at Orono (unofficial abbreviation)
 Mozilla Add-ons, a website formerly referred to as UMO (from update.mozilla.org)
 UMO Jazz Orchestra, a Finnish big band
 University of Mount Olive, a private Christian University located in Mount Olive, North Carolina, USA.